Écs is a village in Győr-Moson-Sopron county, Hungary.

Écs was first mentioned in 1172 as Esu orEchu. In the Middle Ages it was the property of minor noble families, and later of the Pannonhalma Abbey. During the Ottoman invasion, the Cseszneky, Oross and Siey families were the most important landlords in Écs.

Sources 

 Győr vármegye nemesi közgyűléseinek regesztái

External links 
 Street map 

Populated places in Győr-Moson-Sopron County